or  is a lake in Hamarøy Municipality in Nordland county, Norway.

See also
List of lakes of Norway

References

Hamarøy
Lakes of Nordland